The University of the Visayas (UV) is a private institution located in Cebu City, Philippines. It is the first school in the province of Cebu to attain university status.

History
Vicente Gullas (1898–1970) founded the University of the Visayas in 1919 aiming to educate young people from average-income families. It was initially called the Visayan Institute, and occupied two rooms rented at the City Intermediate School. The number of students had increased from 37 in 1919 to 87 in 1920, and kept growing, but Gullas could not find a permanent building for the institute and kept moving over various locations in Cebu, borrowing auxiliary facilities from other schools nearby, such as physical education grounds of the Cebu Normal School and the public library near Fuente Osmeña. Finally, in 1946 the institute moved to its present site at Colon Street, and in 1948 received the university status.

In the 1980s–90s, the university added new master's degrees, in education, engineering, maritime studies, criminology and nursing. In 1994, four of the university programs were recognised by the Philippine Association of Colleges and Universities Commission on Accreditation. Earlier in 1994 the Gullas Medical Center and the College of Medicine were opened in Banilad.

Campuses and location 
The university has nine campuses: 
Main Campus along Colon Street, Cebu City 
Pardo Campus along E. Sabellano St., Brgy. Poblacion Pardo, Cebu City
{Banilad Campus/uvgullascollegeofmedicine.com} along Gov. Cuenco Ave., Brgy. Banilad, Mandaue City
Mandaue Campus along Demetrio M. Cortes St., Brgys. Alang-alang and Cambaro, Mandaue City
Minglanilla Campus along N. Bacalso Ave.(Cebu South Road), Brgy. Pob Ward I, Minglanilla, Cebu 
Compostela Campus along P. Cabatingan St., Brgy. Poblacion, Compostela, Cebu
Dalaguete Campus along Pedro Calungsod St., Brgy. Poblacion, Dalaguete, Cebu
Danao Campus along P.G. Almendras St., Brgy. Poblacion, Danao City, Cebu
Toledo Campus along S. Osmeña St., Brgy. Poblacion, Toledo City, Cebu

The College of Dentistry and Nursing is located in a separate campus in Banilad, Mandaue City at the site of Vicente Gullas Memorial Hospital and the Gullas College of Medicine. The Gullas College of Medicine Mandaue Campus (formerly Mandaue Academy) is located in downtown Cambaro, Mandaue City.

Gallery

Notable alumni 
 Eduardo Gullas, politician
 Elmer Cabahug (retired PBA player)
 Arnulfo "Arnie" Tuadles✝ (retired PBA player)
 Joaquin Rojas, MICAA and PBA basketball player
 Greg Slaughter, PBA basketball player
 Edgardo Labella, mayor of Cebu City
 Nerissa Corazon Soon-Ruiz, councilor of Mandaue City, former Sixth District representative
 Golden Cañedo, UV-Minglanilla, The Clash S1 Grand Champion

See also
Medical education in the Philippines

References

External links
University of the Visayas

Universities and colleges in Cebu City
Educational institutions established in 1919
1919 establishments in the Philippines